Issah Moro (born December 24, 1974) is a Ghanaian retired football forward.

During his career he played with Ghanaian clubs Great Olympics and Dwarfs, before moving to Slovenia where he played for Beltinci and Olimpija. He then moved to Austria, where he played for First Vienna FC, before returning to Slovenia, playing for Livar. He also played for KF Trepça'89 in the Kosovar Superleague.

External links
Stats from Slovenia at PrvaLiga 

Living people
1974 births
Ghanaian footballers
Association football forwards
Ghanaian expatriate footballers
Expatriate footballers in Slovenia
Ghanaian expatriate sportspeople in Slovenia
NK Beltinci players
NK Olimpija Ljubljana (1945–2005) players
NK Ivančna Gorica players
Ghanaian expatriate sportspeople in Austria
Expatriate footballers in Austria
First Vienna FC players
Expatriate footballers in Kosovo
Slovenian PrvaLiga players
KF Trepça'89 players